Hannah Leder (born September 28, 1986) is an American film actress. Born in Los Angeles, California, she is the daughter of director Mimi Leder and actor Gary Werntz.

As a child actress she appeared in the films The Peacemaker (1997), Deep Impact (1998) and Pay It Forward (2000), all of which were directed by her mother Mimi Leder.

She also guest starred in the television series Shameless, Dads, Bad Judge, Revenge and The Comeback. In 2007, she worked as a costume assistant on the television series Shark.

Filmography

References

External links

1986 births
Living people
20th-century American actresses
21st-century American actresses
Actresses from Los Angeles
American child actresses
American film actresses
American television actresses
Jewish American actresses
21st-century American Jews